Ewers may refer to:

Gustav von Ewers (1779–1830), German legal historian
Hanns Heinz Ewers (1871–1943), German writer, philosopher, and actor
Ezra P. Ewers (born circa 1840), American Civil War soldier
Walter Ewers (1892–1918), German World War I pilot
John C. Ewers (1909–1997), American ethnologist and museum curator
John K. Ewers (1904–1978), Australian novelist and poet
Randy Ewers (born 1968), American politician 
Dave Ewers (born 1990), Rugby Union player born in Harare, Zimbabwe 
Marisa Ewers (born 1989), German footballer
Anna Ewers (born 1993), German fashion model
Veronica Ewers (born 1994), American Cyclist
Quinn Ewers (born 2003), American football player

See also
12843 Ewers, an asteroid discovered in 1997
Ewer (disambiguation)